The Slide (stylized SLIDE) is a maglev hoverboard demonstration developed by Lexus. Lexus built a skate park in Barcelona, Spain specifically for the project. The system was built as a promotional demonstration, not for public sale.

Conception 
The overall project took about 57 weeks from start to finish. The SLIDE was teased in June and officially revealed August 5, 2015. Dietmar Berger, a magnetic levitation engineer, and Ludwig Schultz, a pioneer of superconducting levitation, were the main experts responsible for the design of the system. Professional skateboarder Ross McGouran was the main rider  for prototype testing and also promotional riding as well.

Technology 
The main focus of the demonstration is the levitation of the hoverboard, achieved through the use of superconductors inside the board and a magnetic track. The board itself is made of bamboo and carbon fibre support structures. The board has 32 yttrium barium copper oxide superconductors cooled by liquid nitrogen.

Superconductors are conductors that have no internal resistance as long as they are kept below a certain temperature. When a metal has no internal resistance, a current running through the metal will run forever without a power source. When a superconductor is subjected to a magnetic field, the superconductor aligns itself with the magnetic field and floats on top of it. Superconductors only have zero internal resistance when cooled to a certain temperature. Even though liquid nitrogen cools down the superconductors, it also boils at the same temperature. This makes it difficult to have a constant supply of liquid nitrogen to continually cool down the superconductors; the system can only operate for an average time of about 20 minutes on maximum liquid nitrogen onboard capacity.

Track 
The track built by Lexus for the SLIDE project is in Cubelles, Barcelona, Spain. The entire skate park has magnetic tracks concealed beneath a thin layer of wood. The magnetic track pulls the board along the path.  All the uphill and downhill slopes of the track were specifically designed to ensure the magnetic field has enough momentum to pull the board.

References

External links 
 Lexus SLIDE Official Video
 Lexus SLIDE Official Page

Maglev
Skateboards